Little Flower Catholic High School for Girls is a Catholic high school in Philadelphia, Pennsylvania located within the Archdiocese of Philadelphia. It is named after Saint Therese de Lisieux and has one of the most award-winning high school newspapers in the archdiocese, The Theresian.

Little Flower High School consists of roughly 700 girls and 7 boys. The boys are a part of Little Flower's ESOL Program (English for Speakers of Other Languages). The school's Alma Mater is sung by the students at a number of different events throughout the school year, including dances, proms, and assemblies.

Athletics
Fall Sports - Cross Country, Golf, Field Hockey, Soccer, Tennis, Volleyball  
Winter Sports -  Basketball, Bowling, Cheerleading, Indoor Track, Swimming
Spring Sports - Softball, Lacrosse, Track, and Field

Notable alumnae
Christine Nangle - Comedy writer and performer. Best known for The Simpsons, Saturday Night Live, and Inside Amy Schumer.
Evelyn Mattern - American Roman Catholic nun and farmer worker advocate
Courtney Niemiec - professional soccer player, currently playing for the Western New York Flash of the National Women's Soccer League
Allyson McHugh - U.S. Women's National Team member (Swimming), 5 Time USA Swimming National Champion, 2019 NCAA National Champion (1650yd Freestyle)
Brea Bee: Class of 1993- Actress. Best known for her role as the elusive Nikki in the Academy Award winning film Silver Linings Playbook https://www.tvovermind.com/brea-bee/

 Sister Mary Scullion - Sisters of Mercy, Little Flower Class of 1971, is Philadelphia’s nationally renowned expert on homelessness.

Notable volunteers 
 D. Bruce Hanes - Former volunteer judge for the Mock Trial team. 
Because of his public support of same-sex marriage, Hanes has been removed from his volunteer position effective September 17, 2013.

See also
 Northeast Catholic High School for boys
 Philadelphia Catholic League

Notes and references

External links
 Official school website
 Alma Mater

Girls' schools in Pennsylvania
Educational institutions established in 1939
Roman Catholic secondary schools in Philadelphia
1939 establishments in Pennsylvania
Hunting Park, Philadelphia